Jana Novotná and Catherine Suire were the defending champions but only Suire competed that year with Raffaella Reggi.

Reggi and Suire lost in the semifinals to Elise Burgin and Elizabeth Smylie.

Lori McNeil and Betsy Nagelsen won the final on a walkover against Burgin and Smylie.

Seeds
Champion seeds are indicated in bold text while text in italics indicates the round in which those seeds were eliminated.

 Lori McNeil /  Betsy Nagelsen (champions)
 Elise Burgin /  Elizabeth Smylie (final)
 Raffaella Reggi /  Catherine Suire (semifinals)
 Manon Bollegraf /  Claudia Porwik (semifinals)

Draw

References
 1989 Virginia Slims of Oklahoma Doubles Draw

U.S. National Indoor Championships
1989 WTA Tour